"The Greatest" is a song written by Don Schlitz, and recorded by American country music artist Kenny Rogers.  It was released in April 1999 as the first single from the album She Rides Wild Horses.  The song reached No. 26 on the Billboard Hot Country Singles & Tracks chart.

Content
In the song, a little boy is outside playing baseball by himself, saying, "I'm the greatest player," and tosses the ball up in the air to hit the ball and swings and misses. The boy repeats this two more times. As his mother calls him inside for supper, the undeterred boy, in a twist ending, reveals his position—pitcher—and thus by earning a strikeout, he is still the greatest.

In popular culture
The story in the song is played out in a TV commercial by The Foundation for a Better Life, promoting the value of Optimism.

Chart performance

Year-end charts

References

1999 singles
1999 songs
Kenny Rogers songs
Songs written by Don Schlitz
Music videos directed by Shaun Silva
Song recordings produced by Brent Maher